The Little Princess was a cyclecar built in Detroit, Michigan, by the Princess Cyclecar Company from 1913–14.

History 
The Little Princess was designed by Englishman C. J. Thornwell who had worked for Wolseley-Siddeley before coming to America. The cyclecar was powered by a four-cylinder 12hp Farmer engine.  A planetary transmission was used with a shaft drive making more substantial than chain driven cyclecars. The cyclecar was only sold in 1914 before the design was used to develop the Princess light car.

References

Defunct motor vehicle manufacturers of the United States
Motor vehicle manufacturers based in Michigan
Cyclecars
Defunct manufacturing companies based in Detroit

Brass Era vehicles
1910s cars
Vehicle manufacturing companies established in 1913
Vehicle manufacturing companies disestablished in 1914
Cars introduced in 1913